Gábor Egressy may refer to:

 Gábor Egressy (footballer) (born 1974), Hungarian football player
 Gábor Egressy (actor) (1808–1866), Hungarian actor